Li Wen may refer to:

Emperor Yizong of Tang (833–873), originally named Li Wen
Li Wen (general) (1905–1977), KMT general from Hunan
Coco Lee (born 1975), Chinese name Li Wen, Chinese singer, songwriter, and actress
Li Wen (footballer) (born 1989), Chinese footballer
Wen Li (space physicist)